The following is a list of Chinese films first released in 2014. There were 308 Chinese feature films released in China in 2014.

Highest-grossing films
These are the top 10 grossing Chinese films that were released in China in 2014:

2014

January – March

April – June

July – September

October–December

See also 
2014 in China
List of 2014 box office number-one films in China

References

External links
Most Popular Titles With Country of Origin China

2014
Films
Lists of 2014 films by country or language